Sherman House or Sherman Farm may refer to:

David Sherman House, Woodbury, Connecticut, listed on the National Register of Historic Places (NRHP)
Lampson P. Sherman House, Des Moines, Iowa, NRHP-listed
Hoyt Sherman Place, Des Moines, Iowa, NRHP-listed
Sherman House Hotel, Chicago, Illinois, closed in 1973, demolished in 1980 after which the James R. Thompson Center was constructed in its place
The Sherman (Batesville, Indiana), hotel and restaurant formerly known as "Sherman House"
William B. Sherman Farm, North Adams, Massachusetts, NRHP-listed
Eber Sherman Farm, North Adams, Massachusetts, NRHP-listed
Byron R. Sherman House, White Sulphur Springs, Montana, NRHP-listed
The Sherman (Omaha, Nebraska), NRHP-listed
Sherman House (Glens Falls, New York), NRHP-listed
Sherman Farm (Pittstown, New York), NRHP-listed
Elijah Sherman Farm, Berea, North Carolina, NRHP-listed
Red Oak-Sherman, William C., House, Dayton, Ohio, listed on the NRHP in Ohio
John Sherman Birthplace, Lancaster, Ohio, listed on the NRHP in Ohio
John Sherman Memorial Gateway, Mansfield, Ohio, listed on the NRHP in Ohio
Eleanor Sherman House, Monmouth, Oregon, listed on the NRHP in Oregon
Jones–Sherman House, Salem, Oregon, listed on the NRHP in Oregon
L. G. Sherman Tobacco Warehouse, Lancaster, Pennsylvania, NRHP-listed
William Watts Sherman House, Newport, Rhode Island, listed on the NRHP in Rhode Island
Welch-Sherman House, Park City, Utah, listed on the NRHP in Utah
Hosford-Sherman Farm, Poultney, Vermont, NRHP-listed
Sherman House (Alma, Wisconsin), NRHP-listed

See also
The Sherman (disambiguation)
Sherman Historic District (disambiguation)